Surcheh may refer to:
 Surcheh-ye Bala